Kottayam Nazeer is an Indian actor, impressionist, and an artist from Kerala. Kottayam Nazeer started his career as a stage artist . Recently he also started his career in painting. Nazeer is a recipient of the Kerala Sangeetha Nataka Akademi Award (2010) and is the only recipient in the Mimicry category.

Family
Nazeer is married to Haseena. They have two sons, Mohammed Nihal and Mohammed Noufal.

Filmography

 Mimics Action 500 (1995)
 Kidilol Kidilam (1995)
 Mr. Clean (1996)
 KL-7-95 Ernakulam North (1996)
 Aramana Veedum Anjoorekkarum (1996)
 Mannadiyar Penninu Chengkotta Chekkan (1997)
 Mattupetti Machan (1998)
 Aaghosham (1998)
 Meenakshykalyan (1998)
Anuragakottaram (1998) 
 Udayapuram Sulthan (1999)
 Mazhavillu (1999)
 My Dear Karadi (1999)
 Aakasha Ganga (1999) 
 Pattabhishekam (1999)
 Nadanpennum Naattupramaaniyum (2000)
 Koodariyathe (2001)
 Korappan the Great (2001)
 Aparenmar Nagarathil (2001) (also director)
 Sundara Purushan (2001) As Mental Patient
 Jagathy Jagadish in Town (2002)
 www.Anukudumbam.com (2002)
 Kayamkulam Kanaran (2002)
 Ee Bharghavinilayam (2002)
 Kattuchembakam (2002)
 Njan Salperu Ramankutty (2003)
 Govindankutty Thirakkilanu (2004)... SI Jackiechan
 Youth Festival (2004)
 Vamanapuram Bus Route (2004)
 Campus (2004) (Tamil film)
 Kalyanakurimanam (2005)
 Red Salute (2006)
 Shyamam (2006)... Thankappan
 Katha Parayumpol (2007)
 Anchil Oral Arjunan (2007)... Dineshan Mudiyoor
 Sooryan (2007)
 Cycle (2008)
 Bullet (2008)
 Parthan Kanda Paralokam (2008)
 SMS (2008)
 Magic Lamp (2008)... Omanakuttan 
 Gulumaal: The Escape (2009)
 Venalmaram (2009)... Jaffer Kunnakulam
 Oru Naal Varum (2010)
 Kadaksham (2010)
 Oru Small Family (2010)... Blade Vasu
 Avan (2010)
 Aakasha Yathra (2010)
 Malarvaadi Arts Club (2010)
 Canvas (2010).... Manmadhan
 Kadaksham (2010)
 Kudumbasree Travels (2011)
 Sandwich (2011)
 The Filmstaar (2011)
 Kathayile Nayika (2011)
 Manikyakkallu (2011)
 Teja Bhai & Family (2011) as Police
 Oru Kudumba Chithram (2012)... Vakkeel 
 Blackberry (2012)
 Jawan of Vellimala (2012)
 916 (2012)
 Doctor Innocent Aanu (2012)
 Hero (2012)
 Bavuttiyude Namathil (2013)
 Vallatha Pahayan (2013)... Ravi
 Vaidooryam (2013)
 Athade (2013) (His first Telugu movie.)
 Actress (2013)
 Kilikal Paadum Gramam (2013)
 Kauthukalokam (2013)
 Oru Kudumbachitram (2013)
 Ithu Mantramo Thantramo Kuthantramo? (2013)
 Kadal Kadannu Oru Maathukutty (2013)... Kunjumon
 For Sale (2013)... Musthafa
 Pottas Bomb... Mohanan
 Daivathinte Swantham Cleetus (2013)... Varghese
 John Ho nai (2016) as Gunda
 Kattappanayile Rithwik Roshan (2016) as Ajayakumar (Director)
 Sherlock Toms (2017) As SI Shinto
 Aravindante Athidhikal (2018) as Sreekrishnan
 Chalakkudikkaran Changathi (2018) as Hungry Director 
 Brother's Day (2019) as Joy
 B Nilavarayum SharjahPalliyum (2020) as Balan 
 Keshu Ee Veedinte Nadhan (2021) as Gopi
  Ayalvaashi (2023)

Dubbing artist
Enthiran -voice for Cochin Haneefa
Madrasapattinam -voice for Cochin Haneefa
Thalamelam-voice for Jagathy Sreekumar
Mattupetti Machan-voice for Kochu Preman
The Campus -voice for Narendra Prasad
Valathottu Thirinjal Nalamathe Veedu-voice for Narendra Prasad

Television
Comic Cola (Asianet)
Cinemala (Asianet)
Comedy Time (Surya TV)
Kadamattathu Kathanar (TV series) (Asianet)
Gulumal (Surya TV)
Chirikum Pattanam (Kairali TV)
Kerala Cafe (Kairali TV)
Cinema Chirima (Mazhavil)
Evidingananu Bhai (Mazhavil)
25 Kottayam Nazeer Show (Flowers TV)
Flowers Comedy Awards (Flowers TV)
Jollywood (Kairali TV)
Comedy Utsavam (Flowers TV)
Comedy Circus (Mazhavil)
Chaya Koppayile Kodumkaatu (Mazhavil)
Comedy Masters (Amrita TV)
Comedy Stars Season 2 (Asianet)

References

Living people
1973 births
Male actors from Kottayam
Indian male film actors
Indian impressionists (entertainers)
21st-century Indian male actors
Indian male television actors
Indian male comedians
Malayalam comedians
20th-century Indian male actors
Male actors in Malayalam television
Recipients of the Kerala Sangeetha Nataka Akademi Award